Linda Creemers (born 13 January 1985) is a Dutch table tennis player. Her highest career ITTF ranking was 118.

References

1985 births
Living people
Dutch female table tennis players
Sportspeople from Weert
20th-century Dutch women
21st-century Dutch women